"There's Nothing I Won't Do" is the third single released by British electronic producer Jake Williams under the name JX. It was released in May 1996 as a single. The song reached number four in the United Kingdom, where it is JX's highest-charting. It also reached number 26 in Australia and number 14 in Ireland.

Critical reception
James Hamilton from Music Weeks RM Dance Update described the song as a "grandiose swirly anthemic Euro-ish galloper". Dave Fawbert from ShortList called it "an absolutely awesome slice of mid-'90s dance in a thoroughly N-Trance style. God it’s brilliant."

Music video
The music video for "There's Nothing I Won't Do" was directed by Alex Hemming.

Track listingUK CD single'
 "There's Nothing I Won't Do" (original edit)
 "There's Nothing I Won't Do" (JX original mix)
 "There's Nothing I Won't Do" (Red Jerry & JX dub)
 "There's Nothing I Won't Do" (Carl Cox Full House remix)
 "There's Nothing I Won't Do" (Way Out West remix)

Charts

Weekly charts

Year-end charts

Certifications

References

1996 songs
1996 singles
FFRR Records singles
Jake Williams songs